Bakuli Gewog was a gewog (village block) of Samdrup Jongkhar District, Bhutan. It also formed part of Bhangtar Dungkhag, along with Martshala and Dalim and Samrang Gewogs.

References

Former gewogs of Bhutan
Samdrup Jongkhar District